"Saturday Nite Is Dead" is a song by British rock musician Graham Parker, recorded with his backing band the Rumour. The song was released on his 1979 album, Squeezing Out Sparks. Written about his experiences growing up in suburbia, the song features caustic lyrics and an angry vocal delivery.

Though not released as a single, the song has since become one of Parker's most famous songs. The song has seen positive critical reception.

Background and lyrics
"Saturday Nite Is Dead" was written partially as a social critique and about his personal upbringing. He explained, Saturday Night' was not just about controlled fun for the masses on the weekend; it was also a personal thing about growing up." In another interview, Parker pointed to the artificiality of partying on a Saturday as another example of "squeezing out a spark," referencing the album's title.

The song was originally written by Parker as part of a larger album concept about growing up in suburbia. He explained:

Music
Diffuser.fm'''s Dave Swanson describes the song as "a real raver." Parker called it a "pretty angry song" that was "delivered in a very angry way." He elaborated, "Attitude is what's behind it. If you sing in a sort of wimpy attitude, that shows you've been distorted by getting old, that shows you've mellowed, more than the specifics of the songs."

Release and reception
"Saturday Nite Is Dead" was first released on Parker's fourth studio album, Squeezing Out Sparks, in March 1979. The song was not released as a single. It also appears on the compilation album Master Hits: Graham Parker.John M. Borack of Goldmine stated in an interview with Parker that he "always liked" the song. Dave Swanson of Diffuser.fm'' ranked the song as the second best Parker song, calling it "perfection in action" and stating, "This full-on rocker stands as a testament to the power and urgency of the Rumour in their prime. Straight ahead, no frills, traditional rock 'n' roll, delivered full steam ahead, 'Saturday Nite Is Dead' was one of many high points on the fourth GP album. The Rumour tear it up while Graham spits it out."

Parker has said the track is misunderstood, explaining,

References

1979 songs
Graham Parker songs
Song recordings produced by Jack Nitzsche